Uwe Ernst Reinhardt (September 24, 1937 – November 14, 2017) was a professor of political economy at Princeton University and held several positions in the healthcare industry.
 Reinhardt was a prominent scholar in health care economics and a frequent speaker and author on subjects ranging from the war in Iraq to the future of Medicare.

Biography 
Reinhardt was born 1937 in Osnabrück, Germany, and later emigrated to Canada where he received his Bachelor of Commerce degree from University of Saskatchewan. He later received a Ph.D. in economics from Yale University in 1970, with a thesis titled "An Economic Analysis of Physicians' Practices" under the supervision of Richard Ruggles. He taught courses in economic theory and policy, accounting, and health economics and policy. Reinhardt's scholarly work focused on economics and policy and included more far-reaching topics such as cost-benefit analyses of the Lockheed L-1011 TriStar and the Space Shuttle. He died of sepsis on November 14, 2017 in Princeton, NJ. Reinhardt was married to Tsung-Mei Cheng, also known as May Reinhardt.

In July 2015 Reinhardt's 2013 syllabus and first lecture for a class titled "Introductory Korean Drama" received attention from several bloggers. By way of explanation, Reinhardt introduced the class by stating 

 

It was not clear whether Reinhardt actually intended to teach the course.

Research 

Reinhardt's research focused on hospital pricing, systems of health care around the world, Medicare reform, and health care spending. His work appeared in Health Affairs, The New England Journal of Medicine, JAMA,  The British Medical Journal, and The European Heart Journal.

In one paper, Reinhardt discusses the obstacles to success of consumer-directed health care in light of the lack of transparency in hospital pricing. He suggests several reforms that could lead to better information on hospital pricing for consumer decision-making, including a national set of diagnosis-related group weights to which each hospital could then apply its own conversion factor. Reinhardt's previous work on hospitals examined the tax and cost of equity capital advantages of not-for-profit hospitals over for-profit hospitals.

Reinhardt's scholarship analyzed the U.S. health care industry in relation to systems around the world. He argued that higher U.S. health spending is a result of higher U.S. per capita gross domestic product (GDP) as well as intricate and disjointed payment systems. Reinhardt's work on foreign systems of health care includes a 2004 analysis of Switzerland that appeared in JAMA. In it, Reinhardt argued that there is little correlation between the prevalence of consumer choice and the high quality of Swiss health care.

In 2003, Reinhardt and 14 other experts on health policy and the private health care industry signed an open letter arguing that Medicare should lead the U.S. health care industry in paying for performance by tying financial reimbursement to quality measures.

Reinhardt's work on health care spending includes his argument that the aging of the U.S. population is not the primary cause of the growth in U.S. health care spending.

Private industry and advisory roles 
In addition to his university duties, Reinhardt was active as an advisor for government, non-profit organizations, and private industry and held directorships in various for-profit companies in the health industry. Reinhardt served on the Governing Council of the Institute of Medicine of the National Academy of Sciences between 1979 and 1982, after election to the Institute in 1978. At the Institute, he served on a number of study panels, including the Committee on the Implications of For-Profit Medicine, the Committee on Technical Innovation in Medicine, the Committee on the Implications of a Physicians Surplus, and the Committee on the U.S. Physician Supply. In 1996, he was appointed to the Board of Health Care services of the Institute.

From 1986-1995, Reinhardt served three consecutive three-year terms as a Commissioner on the Physician Payment Review Commission (PPRC), established in 1986 by the Congress to advise it on issues related to the payment of physicians. Reinhardt served as a Commissioner for the Kaiser Family Foundation Commission on Medicaid and the Uninsured.  Reinhardt was a member of numerous editorial boards, among them The New England Journal of Medicine, JAMA, The Journal of Health Economics, the Milbank Quarterly, and Health Affairs.

Reinhardt served as a trustee of Duke University and the Tekla Family of Funds. He also served on the Boards of Directors of Boston Scientific Corporation, a leading maker of medical devices, and Amerigroup Corporation, a large health insurer whose clients consist primarily of persons enrolled in Medicare. He served on the Board of Directors of Triad Hospitals, Inc, until that company was merged into Community Health Systems in 2007. He was a regular contributor to the New York Times''' Economix blog, where he wrote about economic matters, particularly the economics of health care.

Role in Taiwan's healthcare system and awards

In 1989, as Taiwan was restructuring its healthcare system, Reinhardt persuaded its leaders to model it on those of Canada and Germany. As of 2014, Taiwan's system provides universal care for 6.6% of GDP. For his contribution, in 2014 he was awarded the nation's Presidential Prize. "Reinhardt Receives Honors for Contributions to Health Care Economics," B. Rose Huber, Woodrow Wilson School News, Princeton Univ 30 Mar 2016 In 2018, Reinhardt was posthumously awarded the First Grade Medal for Professionalism in Health and Welfare by Taiwan's Ministry of Health and Welfare.

 Views 

 Administration 
In the 2009 Frontline show "Sick Around 
America", Reinhardt criticized the United States for spending 24% of every health care dollar on administration, and pointed out that Canada spends less than half of the U.S. amount and Taiwan spends significantly less than Canada. Reinhardt faulted the seeming U.S. preference for an unwieldy "mishmash of private insurance plans" for the inefficiency. He said if the U.S. could spend half as much on administration, it would save more than enough money to cover all the uninsured.

 Selected articles 
 "Little hope for the uninsured." Denver Post'', January 25, 2004; E4.

References

External links 

 Uwe Reinhardt's remarks on Princeton Class Day 1995
 Uwe Reinhardt's appearances on National Public Radio
 Institute of Medicine official web site
 Hambrecht and Quist Capital Investors official web site
 Boston Scientific official web site
 Reinhardt's posts on the New York Times Economix blog
 

1937 births
2017 deaths
American economists
Canadian economists
Health economists
Yale University alumni
Princeton University faculty
University of Saskatchewan alumni
German emigrants to the United States
German emigrants to Canada
Writers from Osnabrück
Recipients of the Cross of the Order of Merit of the Federal Republic of Germany
Members of the National Academy of Medicine